CKIN-FM, branded on-air as Radio CINA, is an FM commercial (multilingual) radio station which operates at 106.3 MHz (FM) in Montreal, Quebec, Canada. Its headquarters are at 1955 Côte-de-Liesse, Saint Laurent although initially CKIN broadcast through temporary studios located on Avenue du Parc in Montreal being the facilities of CKDG, with its transmitter located atop Mount Royal. The station's multiethnic programming is primarily in Arabic, with evening blocks in Spanish, and hour-long blocks with other third languages including Assyrian, Berber, Cantonese, Italian, Hindi and Urdu.

History

On August 20, 2009, Canadian Hellenic Cable Radio Ltd. (CHCR) received Canadian Radio-television and Telecommunications Commission (CRTC) approval to operate a new multilingual specialty radio station at Montreal. The station would serve as a sister to CKDG-FM and use a similar format, under which it would air mainstream programming targeting French listeners during peak drive times, and air programming in Arabic, Armenian, Romanian, and Spanish among others throughout the rest of the day.

On May 20, 2015, Canadian Hellenic Cable Radio announced that they intend to sell CKIN-FM to Neeti P. Ray, who owns similarly-formatted stations CINA in Mississauga, Ontario, and CINA-FM in Windsor, Ontario. Ray previously sought licenses for a new station in Montreal twice (in 2007 and 2011), but was turned down in both instances.  CHCR intended to use the sale to fund improvements to CKDG.
 Following the closure of the acquisition, CKIN was rebranded as CINA Radio (a brand shared by Ray's other multilingual stations), and launched a revamped schedule with a larger focus on Arabic and Spanish-language programming. Arabic programming constitutes the majority of its schedule on weekdays and weekends, while Spanish-language programming is aired during the evening hours on weekdays. Hour-long blocks with programming in other languages are carried on weekend mornings to comply with the requirement that CKIN air programming in at least eight languages other than English and French. The changes were meant to improve the viability of the station, as the Arabian and Hispanic communities are among the largest ethnic groups in Montreal. Its Arabic programming was aimed towards a younger audience than its main competitor, CHOU Radio Moyen-Orient.

The owners of CHOU filed a complaint with the CRTC over the shift to Arabic programming, arguing that Ray had promised to maintain CKIN's existing programming, while increasing its production of local South Asian programming. The CRTC dismissed the complaint on October 14, 2016, stating that CKIN-FM's license, nor the approval of the sale, had any conditions requiring the station to serve specific cultural groups—only that it must target at least six different groups, and air programs in at least eight different languages. Its license has since been renewed through August 31, 2024.

References

External links
 
 Radio CINA Arabic Facebook page
 

Kin
Kin
Radio stations established in 2009
2009 establishments in Quebec